Napoleone is an Italian male given name. St. Napoleone of Alexandria, alternatively rendered as Neopulus, Neopolus, Neopolis or Neópolo, whose feast day is August 15, was martyred during the early fourth century during the Diocletianic Persecution.

Gabriele Rosa (1858) followed G. F. Zanetti (1751) in accepting the meaning as "nose of lion", though this etymology is viewed sceptically in later sources such as Pio Rajna (1891). 

The form Napoleone  is found as early as Napoleone Orsini Frangipani (1263-1342) a Roman Cardinal.  Rosa (1858) identified the name from 1240 as a nickname of a member of the Della Torre family of Valsassina. 

The most famous holder of the name, with whom the name became virtually synonymous, was Napoléon Bonaparte (1769-1821), christened Napoleone di Buonaparte (Nabulione di Buonaparte according to old Corsican spelling). Damiano Morali (1847) identified the given name Napoleone having first entered the Italian Buonaparte family in 1648.

References

Italian masculine given names